This article is about the particular significance of the year 1940 to Wales and its people.

Incumbents
Archbishop of Wales – Charles Green, Bishop of Bangor
Archdruid of the National Eisteddfod of Wales – Crwys

Events
21 January - Lowest ever temperature recorded in Wales, -23.3 °C (-9.9 °F) at Rhayader.
27 January - A freak ice storm across the UK brings down telephone and electricity lines in many parts of Wales.
3 March - The steamer Cato is damaged by a mine off Nash Point and 13 of the crew are killed.
March - The scenic railway opens at Barry Island Pleasure Park.
May
The newly created Coalition Government includes Hugh Dalton as Minister of Economic Warfare.
Alun Lewis enlists.
8 May - Three Nazi German Luftwaffe Heinkel 111s crash in separate incidents over Wales: one near Wrexham, one at Malpas in Denbighshire, and one at Bagillt, Flint. In all nine crew are killed and four captured.
3 July - Cardiff is bombed for the first time.
9 July - Cardiff suffers its first bombing fatalities.
10 July - Ten people are killed in an air raid on Swansea Docks, as shipping convoys become a target.
11 July - Communist minister and poet Thomas Evan Nicholas ("Niclas y Glais") and his son are arrested and interned for "endeavouring to impede recruitment to HM Forces". Nicholas is eventually released on 20 October.
11 August - Seventeen people are killed in an air raid on Manselton, Swansea.
14 August - Three German Heinkel 111s are shot down during an air-raid on Cardiff, and another over North Wales after a raid on RAF Hawarden.
22 August - A steamer, the Thorold, is sunk by German aircraft off the Skerries. Ten crew are killed.
2 September - 33 people are killed in an air raid on Swansea.
3 September - Eleven people are killed in an air raid on Cardiff.
4 September - A German Junkers 88 crashes near Machynlleth.  Four crew and a Gestapo officer are captured.
13 September - A German Heinkel 111 crashes into a house in Newport, Monmouthshire.
22 November - The steamer Pikepool is damaged by a mine off Linney Head, Pembrokeshire, with the loss of 17 crew.
The Urdd changes its policy to include 16- to 25-year-olds.
Gwilym Williams becomes chaplain of St David's College, Lampeter.
Percy Cudlipp becomes editor of the Daily Herald.
Alun Talfan Davies and his brother Aneirin found the publishing house Llyfrau'r Dryw.

Arts and literature
Lewis Casson directs John Gielgud in King Lear.

Awards
National Eisteddfod of Wales (held in Bangor (radio))
National Eisteddfod of Wales: Chair - withheld
National Eisteddfod of Wales: Crown - T. Rowland Hughes
National Eisteddfod of Wales: Prose Medal - withheld

New books
Richard Bennett - Cyfrol Goffa Richard Bennett
Clara Novello Davies - The Life I Have Loved
David Delta Edwards - Rhedeg ar ôl y Cysgodion
John Cowper Powys - Owen Glendower (U.S. publication)
Howard Spring - Fame is the Spur
Ransom Riggs - Miss Peregrine's Home for Peculiar Children (published 2011; partially set in Wales, 1940)

Music
Mai Jones & Lyn Joshua - "We'll Keep a Welcome" (performed for the first time in the forces' variety show, Welsh Rarebit on 29 February)
Grace Williams - Fantasia on Welsh Nursery Tunes (score dated 9 February)

Film
March 25 - Plaza Cinema opens in Port Talbot.
April 6 - Paul Robeson and Rachel Thomas star in The Proud Valley (cinematic release)

Broadcasting
25 February - The Proud Valley is the first film to have its première on radio, when the BBC broadcasts a 60-minute version.
May - The BBC Radio Variety Department relocates to Bangor because of wartime disruption; it will broadcast from here until August 1943.
August - The National Eisteddfod of Wales is broadcast on the British Home Service, including 15 minutes each for the crown and chair ceremonies.

Sport
Football
13 April - Wales defeat England 1 - 0.
Quoits - Jack Price wins the Welsh championship for the third time.

Births
4 January - Brian Josephson, theoretical physicist
17 January - Leighton Rees, darts champion (died 2003)
23 January - Ted Rowlands, politician
1 March - David Broome, show jumping champion
16 May - Sir Gareth Roberts, physicist (died 2007)
7 June - Tom Jones, singer
29 June - John Dawes, rugby player (died 2021)
17 July - C. W. Nicol, Japanese writer and environmentalist (died 2020 in Japan)
3 September - Eduardo Hughes Galeano, Uruguayan writer of Welsh descent
20 September - Anna Pavord, gardening writer
1 October - Atarah Ben-Tovim, flautist and children's concert promoter (died 2022)
14 October - Christopher Timothy, actor
31 October - Eric Griffiths, skiffle guitarist with The Quarrymen (died 2005)
4 November - Daniel Sperber, Talmudic scholar
30 November - Peter Shreeves, footballer, coach and manager
5 December
Michael Jones, medieval historian
"Exotic" Adrian Street, professional wrestler
24 December - John Marek, politician
date unknown
Donald Evans, Welsh-language poet
Keith Miles, detective novelist and screenwriter

Deaths
12 February - William Edwards, educationist, 89
21 February - Sir Alfred Edward Lewis, banker, 71
15 March - John Davies, author, 71
20 March - William Thomas Edwards (Gwilym Deudraeth), poet
7 April - Ernest Rowland, priest and Wales international rugby player, 75
27 April - Fred Cornish, Wales international rugby player
23 May - Hugh Hesketh Hughes, polo player, 37 (killed in action)
4 June - Owen Picton Davies, businessman and politician, 68
25 June - Stanley Winmill, Wales international rugby union player, 51
3 July - George Bevan Bowen, landowner, 82
8 August - Daniel Lleufer Thomas, lawyer and biographer, 76
20 August - Henry Maldwyn Hughes, Wesleyan minister
26 September - W. H. Davies, poet and author, 69
9 October - Sir Wilfred Grenfell, medical missionary to Newfoundland and Labrador
9 November - Gwilym Owen, physicist
15 December
Robert Thomas Jones, quarrymen's leader, 66
Sir David Richard Llewellyn, 1st Baronet, industrialist

See also
1940 in Northern Ireland

References

Wales